Australia is scheduled to compete in the 2017 Asian Winter Games in Sapporo and Obihiro, Japan from 19 to 26 February. This will mark the debut of the country at the Asian Winter Games, however its athletes are not eligible to win any medals, as the team is classified as guest competitors.

Australia's team of 30 athletes (18 men and 12 women) is scheduled to compete in three sports (eight disciplines). The number of athletes was later reduced to 30. The team consists mostly of developmental athletes, mixed with some who are expected to qualify for the 2018 Winter Olympics in PyeongChang, South Korea.

On 18 February 2017 it was announced that short track speed skater Deanna Lockett would be the country's flagbearer during the parade of nations at the opening ceremony.

Competitors
The following table lists the Australian delegation per sport and gender.

Alpine skiing

Australia's alpine skiing delegation consists of two athletes, one male and one female.

Biathlon

Australia's biathlon team consists of four athletes, two men and two women.

Men             
Jeremy Flanagan                  
Damon Morton    

Women
Jillian Colebourn                     
Darcie Morton

Cross-country skiing

Australia's cross-country skiing team consists of three athletes, two men and one woman.

Men
Jackson Bursill
Ben Sim

Woman
Casey Wright

Figure skating

Australia's figure skating team consists of six athletes.

Freestyle skiing

Australia's freestyle skiing team consists of four athletes, two men and two women.

Men
Ben Matsumoto
Cooper Woods-Topalovic

Women
Jakara Anthony                       
Sophie Ash

Short track speed skating

Australia's short track speed skating team consists of six athletes, five men and one woman.

Men
Pierre Boda
Denali Blunden
Keanu Blunden
Alex Bryant
Andy Jung

Woman
Deanna Lockett

Speed skating

Australia's speed skating squad consists of one male athlete.

Men
Joshua Capponi

Snowboarding

Australia's snowboarding team consists of four athletes, two men and two women.

Alpine

Halfpipe                   
Holly Crawford – halfpipe

References

Nations at the 2017 Asian Winter Games
Asian Winter Games
Australia at the Asian Winter Games